Monaco's entry in the Eurovision Song Contest 2004 in Istanbul was the first after a twenty-five-year break. They were represented by Maryon with the song "Notre planète".

Before Eurovision

Internal selection 

TMC announced in October 2003 that the Monégasque entry for the 2004 Eurovision Song Contest would be selected internally. Female performers residing in Monaco, Southern France or Corsica were able to submit an application between 24 January 2004 and 14 February 2004. The broadcaster received 500 applications at the closing of the deadline and 21 performers were selected by TMC for performer auditions which took place on 21 February 2004. 

On 22 February 2004, TMC announced that Maryon was selected as the Monégasque entrant for the Eurovision Song Contest 2004 with the song "Notre planète". Her song was "Notre Planete", a disco-themed song about the Mediterranean Sea and its need for protection. Monaco's Prince Albert congratulated Maryon publicly upon her selection.

At Eurovision
Because of Monaco's absence from the contest, they had to compete in the semi-final (incidentally this was the first televised Eurovision semi-final). On the night in Istanbul, Maryon performed her song along with some back-up dancers – however she finished in 19th place out of 22 acts, before Switzerland and Slovenia, with just 10 points and therefore had failed to qualify to the Final. The voting from Monaco during the semi-final was declared invalid because of the lack of votes cast and so a back-up jury had to be used for the semi-final. Some suggested she suffered from France's decision not to broadcast the semi-final and therefore not vote – the two nations would have a tradition of giving each other high marks. The year later the EBU stated that every country broadcasting the final would also have to broadcast the semi-final, meaning that this problem did not arise for Lise Darly.

Voting

Points awarded to Monaco

Points awarded by Monaco

References

2004
Countries in the Eurovision Song Contest 2004
Eurovision